The Brandenburg University of Applied Sciences (official name German: Technische Hochschule Brandenburg, known as THB or TH Brandenburg) is a University of Applied Science (UAS) located in Brandenburg an der Havel, Germany. It was founded in 1992 as the Fachhochschule Brandenburg and became the first Hochschule of Brandenburg an der Havel. The campus of the Brandenburg University of Applied Sciences is situated in the Altstadt, in a former military complex from the 19th century. The students of the Brandenburg University of Applied Science are being supervised by about 260 employees. The focus of the courses of studies offered in the three faculties is on the so-called STEM subjects.

References 

Universities of Applied Sciences in Germany
Universities and colleges in Brandenburg
1992 establishments in Germany
Technical universities and colleges in Germany